The 2020 United States presidential election in Mississippi was held on Tuesday, November 3, 2020, as part of the 2020 United States presidential election in which all 50 states plus the District of Columbia participated. Mississippi voters chose electors to represent them in the Electoral College via a popular vote, pitting the Republican Party's nominee, incumbent President Donald Trump, and running mate Vice President Mike Pence against Democratic Party nominee, former Vice President Joe Biden, and his running mate California Senator Kamala Harris. Mississippi has six electoral votes in the Electoral College.

Trump scored a convincing victory in Mississippi, a socially conservative Bible Belt state. Biden's main support was in the western Delta counties next to the Mississippi River, and in Hinds County, home to the state capital and largest city of Jackson. In contrast, Trump's margins came from the regions bordering the Gulf Coast, the northeast Appalachian area, and the Jackson and Memphis suburbs. Trump's strength also came from winning 81% of the White vote, which constituted 69% of the electorate. 57% of voters believed abortion should be illegal in all or most cases and they backed the president 82%-17%. Trump also received 89% of the Evangelical vote, which made up 54% of the electorate. Biden managed to very narrowly flip Warren County, winning it with 49.6% of the vote to Trump's 49.2%. Nonetheless, Biden became the first Democrat to win the White House without carrying Chickasaw or Panola counties since Lyndon B. Johnson in 1964.

Primary elections
The primary elections were held on March 10, 2020.

Republican primary

Democratic primary
Congresswoman Tulsi Gabbard of Hawaii, Senator Bernie Sanders of Vermont and former Vice President Joe Biden were the major declared candidates still active in the race.

General election

Predictions

Polling
Graphical summary

Aggregate polls

Polls

Donald Trump vs. Bernie Sanders

Results

By county

Counties that flipped from Republican to Democratic
 Warren (largest city: Vicksburg)

By congressional district
Trump won 3 of 4 congressional districts.

Analysis
Mississippi, a conservative state in the Deep South and greater Bible Belt, has not been won by a Democrat since the 1976 victory of fellow Southerner Jimmy Carter. Trump easily carried the state on election day by a 16.54% margin. 

Despite Biden's loss statewide, he did manage to flip Warren County, home to Vicksburg, which had voted Democratic in 2012 but flipped back to the GOP column in 2016. In other elections, Republican Cindy Hyde-Smith defeated Democrat Mike Espy by almost 10 points in the simultaneous senatorial race. Although Hyde-Smith underperformed Trump, she still won by a somewhat comfortable margin.

In referendums, a statewide referendum to approve a new flag after their controversial previous one, which contained the Confederate battle ensign, was rejected. The new alternative passed with over 71% of the vote. Medical marijuana was approved in the state with more than 61% of voters supporting the legalization. The less restrictive of the medical marijuana bills, Initiative 65, passed with over 57% selecting the less restrictive of two options to legalize medical marijuana. The state also voted to get rid of the electoral college system that had been in place to elect statewide officials. Over 74% of Mississippians voted to remove the provision that a candidate must receive the support of a majority of Mississippi Legislature House districts.

This is the fourth consecutive election in which Mississippi voted more Democratic than each of its neighboring states. Per exit polls by the Associated Press, Trump's strength in Mississippi came from White born-again/Evangelical Christians, of whom 89% supported Trump. 59% of voters believed abortion should be illegal in all or most cases, and these voters backed Trump 83%–16%. As is the case in many Southern states, there was a stark racial divide in voting for this election: 82% of White Mississipians supported Trump, while 93% of Black Mississippians supported Biden.

See also
 United States presidential elections in Mississippi
 2020 United States presidential election
 2020 Democratic Party presidential primaries
 2020 Republican Party presidential primaries
 2020 United States elections

Notes

Partisan clients

References

Further reading

External links
 
 
  (state affiliate of the U.S. League of Women Voters)
 

Mississippi
2020
Presidential